Provanna sculpta is a species of sea snail, a marine gastropod mollusk in the family Provannidae.

Distribution
This species occurs in the Gulf of Mexico, off Louisiana.

Description 
The maximum recorded shell length is 7.1 mm.

Habitat 
Minimum recorded depth is 576 m. Maximum recorded depth is 576 m.

References

 Rosenberg, G., F. Moretzsohn, and E. F. García. 2009. Gastropoda (Mollusca) of the Gulf of Mexico, Pp. 579–699 in Felder, D.L. and D.K. Camp (eds.), Gulf of Mexico–Origins, Waters, and Biota. Biodiversity. Texas A&M Press, College Station, Texas.

External links
 Warén A. & Ponder W.F. (1991). New species, anatomy, and systematic position of the hydrothermal vent and hydrocarbon seep gastropod family Provannidae fam.n. (Caenogastropoda). Zoologica Scripta. 20(1): 27-56
 Warén A. & Bouchet P. (2001). Gastropoda and Monoplacophora from hydrothermal vents and seeps new taxa and records. The Veliger 44(2): 116–231 

sculpta
Gastropods described in 1991